National Kaohsiung First University of Science and Technology (NKFUST) was a national coeducational university in Nanzih District, Kaohsiung, Taiwan. It was colloquially known as Gaokeda (高科大®, Pinyin Gaōkēdà) or Gaoxiongkeda (高雄科大®, Pinyin Gaōxióngkēdà). Its campus is on 750,000 m2. In 2018, NKFUST merged with National Kaohsiung University of Applied Sciences (KUAS) and National Kaohsiung Marine University (NKMU) to form National Kaohsiung University of Science and Technology (NKUST).

The university consists of the colleges of Engineering, Electrical Engineering and Computer Science, Management, Finance and Banking and Foreign Languages with 15 departments and 27 graduate institutes. Around 269 teachers and 7,804 students are engaged in academic activities.

History
NKFUST, formerly known as National Institute of Technology at Kaohsiung (often abbreviated NITK), was established on July 1, 1995 by the Ministry of Education (Republic of China) to educate students to develop Taiwan into an Asia-Pacific Regional Operations Center (APROC).

The Ministry of Education approved the upgrade of its status to university on July 1, 1998 and it was renamed National Kaohsiung First University of Science and Technology, the first higher education institution of technical and vocational education system in Kaohsiung.

University presidents

National Institute of Technology at Kaohsiung 
Chia-hung Ku: July 1995–July 1998

National Kaohsiung First University of Science and Technology 
Chia-hung Ku: July 1998–July 2004
I-chang Jou: August 2004–July 2009
Jyh-Horng Chou: August 2009–February 2010
Meng-Hsiang Hsu: March 2010–April 2010
Roger C. Y. Chen: May 2010–February 2018

History

National Institute of Technology at Kaohsiung (often abbreviated NITK) was established on July 1, 1995 by the Ministry of Education (Republic of China). Dr. Chia-hung Ku was the first president.

In July 1998, the NITK received the approval from the Ministry of Education to rename as National Kaohsiung First University of Science and Technology (NKFUST) as the first higher education institution of technical and vocational education system in the Kaohsiung area.

Campus

NKFUST has a 75-hectare area in Kaohsiung City in southern Taiwan. The university is divided by National Highway No. 1 into the East and West campuses.

The East campus is mainly for teaching activities and the West campus for student residence and recreation. The campuses cover 750,000 square meters, with 191,533 square meters of building area.

The library has a collection of 284,921 items including books, audiovisual material and journals. There are 7,768 subscribing papers and electronic journals and 200 databases.

Academics

College of Engineering
Ph.D. Program, Institute of Engineering Science and Technology
Institute of Systems and Control Engineering
Department of Construction Engineering
Department of Safety, Health and Environmental Engineering
Department of Mechanical and Automation Engineering, Institute of Industrial Design
College of Management
Ph.D. Program, Institute of Management
Institute of Business Management
International Master of Business Administration (IMBA)
Institute of Law in Science and Technology
Department of Logistics Management
Department of Information Management, Institute of Electronic Business
Department of Marketing and Distribution Management, Institute of Service Science and Management
College of Electrical Engineering and Computer Science
Institute of Electro-Optical Engineering
Undergraduate Honors Program of Engineering
Department of Computer and Communication Engineering
Department of Electronic Engineering
College of Finance and Banking
Ph.D. Program, Institute of Finance and Banking
Department of Money and Banking, Institute of Financial Planning
Department of Risk Management and Insurance
Department of Finance
Department of Accounting and Information Systems
College of Foreign Languages
Department of English, Institute of Interpreting and Translation
Department of Japanese Language
Department of German Language

Language Center

The objectives of the Language Center provides a modernized, multifunctional and individualized environment for language learning.

Chinese Language Program

The Language Center offers a non-credited Chinese language program for students wishing to improve their Chinese. The course emphasizes pronunciation, communication skills for daily situations, and simple writing.

Foreign Language Program
The Language Center provides courses for many foreign languages, such as Japanese, German, French, Spanish, and Korean.

Sports, clubs, and student traditions

The university fosters students' ability to think independently and to lead and work in teams. It encourages students to set up clubs according to their interests. There are 65 clubs which fall into seven categories: academic learning; music and drama; friendship; service; entertainment; sports; and others.

The university promotes sports in hope of fostering students’ lifelong interest and to promote students' mental and physical fitness. Every year, there are campus-wide sports activities such as cheering competition, jogging on campus, and anniversary sport competitions.

Notable alumni
 Hung Tzu-yung, member of Legislative Yuan
 Pong Cheng-sheng, Deputy Mayor of Taipei
 Wu Hong-mo, Minister of Public Construction Commission

Sister universities

See also
 List of universities in Taiwan

References

External links

 Official Website | (English)
 Department of English at the NKFUST
 History of the NKFUST

 
1995 establishments in Taiwan